The following is the final results of the Iranian Volleyball League First Division (Kowsar Cup) 1996/97 season.

Regular season

Group A

Group B

Final 4

All matches at the Azadi Volleyball Hall.

|}

References 
 volleyball.ir
 Parssport

League 1996-97
Iran Super League, 1996-97
Iran Super League, 1996-97
Volleyball League, 1996-97
Volleyball League, 1996-97